Kilimangalam is a village in the Tittakudi Taluk of Cuddalore district, Tamil Nadu, India.

Demographics 

As per the 2001 census, Kilimangalam had a total population of 2497 with 1249 males and 1248 females.

References 

Villages in Ariyalur district